Leeroy Owusu (born 13 August 1996) is a Dutch professional footballer of Ghanaian descent who plays as a right back for Willem II.

Club career 
On 15 March 2013, Owusu signed a three-year contract with Ajax, tying him down to the club until 30 June 2016. He made his debut for Jong Ajax as a half-time substitute for Joël Veltman in an Eerste Divisie match against Telstar on 11 August 2014. In November 2014, Owusu extended his contract with Ajax until 2019.

Career statistics

References

External links
 
 

1996 births
Living people
Dutch footballers
Dutch people of Ghanaian descent
Association football defenders
AFC Ajax players
Jong Ajax players
Excelsior Rotterdam players
De Graafschap players
Willem II (football club) players
Eredivisie players
Eerste Divisie players
Netherlands youth international footballers
People from Purmerend
Footballers from North Holland